Roberto Menassi (born January 21, 1981) is an Italian former football midfielder.

Caps in Italian Series 
 Serie C1 : 119 Caps, 2 goal
 Serie C2 : 136 Caps, 3 goal

References

External links
Profile at lega-calcio.it

Living people
1981 births
Sportspeople from the Province of Bergamo
Italian footballers
Association football midfielders
A.C. Montichiari players
A.C. Monza players
A.C. Perugia Calcio players
U.S. Alessandria Calcio 1912 players
Serie C players
Footballers from Lombardy